Tonghe Township is a township of Tanghe County, Henan province, China. , it has 20 villages under its administration:
Tongyi (Tong First) Village
Tong'er (Tong Second) Village
Tongsan (Tong Third) Village
Tongsi (Tong Fourth) Village
Chenzhuang Village
Liying Village
Fanying Village
Qiuzhuang Village
Wuzhuang Village
Shenlaojia Village
Guanyuan Village
Yanhe Village
Xiaoguozhuang Village
Gengzhuang Village
Daguozhuang Village
Shenqiao Village
Nianzhuang Village
Qinghezhuang Village
Lisizhuang Village
Liuhuo Village

See also
List of township-level divisions of Henan

References

Township-level divisions of Henan
Tanghe County